The North American International Auto Show (NAIAS), also known as the Detroit Auto Show as of 2022 and prior to NAIAS, is an annual auto show held in Detroit, Michigan, U.S., at Huntington Place. The show was held in January from 1989 to 2019. It was intended to move to the summer in 2020, but was canceled due to the COVID-19 pandemic that year and 2021, before returning in September 2022. It is among the largest auto shows in North America. UPI says the show is "regarded as the foremost venue for [car] manufacturers to unveil new products".

The show begins with press preview days, industry preview days and a charity preview event. The charity preview raises money for local children's charities. In 2004 and 2005, the charity preview attracted 17,500 people at $400 a ticket and raised $7 million in total. 2006 was the sixth consecutive year the charity preview event raised over $6 million. 35,711 tickets were sold for the industry preview representing people from 24 countries in 2005 and 6,897 credentialed press from 63 countries. Over 800,000 attended during the days the show was open to the general public in 2018; it is estimated that the show generates a revenue of over $500 million to the local economy.

History
In 1899, William E. Metzger helped organize the Detroit Auto Show, only the second of its kind, after the 1898 Paris Auto Show. An auto show was held in Detroit in 1907 at Beller's Beer Garden at Riverside Park and since then annually except 1941–1953. During the show's first decades of existence it portrayed only a regional focus. In 1957 international carmakers exhibited for the first time.

In 1987, the Detroit Auto Dealers Association (DADA) proposed it become international. The members of the DADA went to places such as Europe and Japan in the attempt to convince those unveiling their new brands or vehicles in those countries to bring those unveilings to the North American Auto Show. That attempt proved to be successful; the North American Auto Show was then renamed the North American International Auto Show in 1989. The NAIAS was the first (and, until 2006, only) auto show in the United States sanctioned by the Organisation Internationale des Constructeurs d'Automobiles.

Prior to being held at the TCF Center, the show was held at other well known places in the Metro Detroit area, including the Light Guard Armory, Wayne Gardens pavilion, and Michigan State Fairgrounds.

Record attendance was in 2003, with 838,066 attendees. In 2009, attendance was 650,517. In 2016, there were 815,575 in ticketed attendance, after reaching 803,451 in 2015.

Audi, BMW and Mercedes-Benz were not present at the 2019 edition, following recent absences of other luxury manufacturers like Porsche, Jaguar, Land Rover and Volvo.

In 2018, plans were made to move the show from January to June beginning in 2020, in hopes of attracting more visitors and adding outdoor events, with plans for an "auto plaza" around Woodward and Jefferson avenues, in addition to the indoor exhibition at TCF Center. An outdoor festival known as "Motor Bella" was to precede the show, which would showcase European supercars. The 2020 edition was cancelled due to the COVID-19 pandemic, due to Michigan health orders and TCF Center being used as a field hospital by FEMA.

In 2020, plans were made to move the 2021 show from June to late September due to the continued pandemic. However, the 2021 edition was also canceled. The NAIAS organizers held Motor Bella at the M1 Concourse in Pontiac, Michigan as a partial replacement, which was an outdoor enthusiast event running from September 21–26. Executive director Rod Alberts stated that "we cannot ignore the major disruptions caused by the pandemic and the impact it has had on budgets. As such, we will be providing an amazing experience to the media, the auto industry and the public in a cost-effective way."

The 2022 edition returned to downdown Detroit and was held in September. The format is scheduled to be unchanged for the 2023 edition.

Awards
Two major awards are presented at the auto show: the EyesOn Design Awards for Design Excellence, and the Car, Truck, and Utility of the Year Award, which was founded in 1994. At the North American Car, Truck and Utility Vehicle of the Year awards, awarded in the preview period of the auto show, around 55 automotive journalists serve as judges. They evaluate "value, innovation, design, performance, safety, technology and driver satisfaction."
 
EyesOn Design Awards for Design Excellence
2004: Winners were the Mazda Kabura concept for "Aesthetics & Innovation", the Ferrari FXX prototype for "Functionality", and the Chevrolet Camaro (fifth generation) model for "Concept Implementation".
2007: Winners were the 2007 Chrysler Nassau concept for "Aesthetics & Innovation", the Kia Kue concept for "Functionality", the 2008 Cadillac CTS (second generation) production model for "Concept Implementation", and the Jeep Trailhawk concept for "Spirit of Industrial Design".
2008: The Cadillac CTS concept and the Chrysler ecoVoyager won the awards for concept car and truck. The 2009 Cadillac CTS-V and the BMW X6 received the Design Excellence awards for best production car and truck.
2009: The Audi Sportback and the Cadillac Converj (ELR) won the "Excellence in Design Award" for concept vehicles debuted at the Detroit. The Audi R8 V10 and the BMW Z4 (E89) received the Design Excellence award for production vehicles.
2010: The GMC Granite won the Excellence in Design Award for concept vehicles debuted at the Detroit show and the Audi A8 received the top honor for production vehicles.
2011: The Porsche 918 RSR won for concept vehicles debuted at the Detroit show and the 2011 Audi A6 received the award for production vehicles.
2012: The Lexus LF-LC won the "Excellence in Design Award" for concept vehicles debuted at the Detroit show and the 2013 Ford Fusion received the top honor for production vehicles.
2013: The 2014 Cadillac ELR won the "Production Category" at the Detroit show while the Nissan Resonance concept and the Ford Atlas concept tied for the "Concept Category" award.
2014: The 2015 Ford Mustang won "Best Production Vehicle" while the Volvo Concept XC Coupé took awards for both "Best Concept Vehicle" and "Best Use of Color, Graphics, and Materials".
2015: The Ford GT won "Best Designed Production Vehicle" award while the Buick Avenir was selected as both "Best Concept Vehicle" and "Best Use of Color, Graphics, and Materials" and the Audi Q7 received Best Designed Interior.

Car, Truck, and Utility of the Year Award
2007: The Saturn Aura and Chevrolet Silverado received the North American Car and Truck of the Year awards.
2008: Won by the 2008 Chevrolet Malibu and Mazda CX-9.
2009: Won by the Hyundai Genesis and Ford F-150.
2010: Won by the Ford Fusion Hybrid and Ford Transit Connect.
2011: Won by the Chevrolet Volt and Ford Explorer.
2012: Won by the Hyundai Elantra and Range Rover Evoque.
2013: Won by the Cadillac ATS and Ram 1500.
2014: Won by the Chevrolet Corvette Stingray and Chevrolet Silverado.
2015: Won by the VW Golf/Golf GTI and Ford F-150.
2016: The Honda Civic and Volvo XC90 received the show's North American Car and Truck/Utility of the Year awards.
2017: The Chevrolet Bolt, Honda Ridgeline, and Chrysler Pacifica received the show's North American Car, Truck, and Utility of the Year awards, respectively. This was the first year Truck (pickup trucks and commercial vans) and Utility (SUVs, crossovers, and minivans) were awarded separately.
2018: The Honda Accord, Lincoln Navigator, and Volvo XC60 received the show's North American Car, Truck, and Utility of the Year awards, respectively.
2019: The Genesis G70, Ram 1500, and Hyundai Kona received the show's North American Car, Truck, and Utility of the Year awards, respectively.

Years

2022
The 2022 show ran from September 17–25, with the media preview on the 14th and the charity preview on the 16th. The media preview was visited by President Joe Biden, and the charity preview featured a performance by Nile Rodgers & Chic.

Returning from a three-year hiatus, the 2022 edition featured a redesigned layout, with the main exhibits and many events indoors at Huntington Place, and other events outdoors in nearby Hart Plaza. Stellantis, Ford, General Motors, Toyota, and Subaru were the only automakers with major exhibits on the convention floor, while Volkswagen had a smaller presence elsewhere at Huntington Place. Some other automakers, such as Nissan, Hyundai, and Mercedes-Benz, were represented by new vehicles on display on the convention floor, but without a branded exhibit.

Stellantis rented the World's Largest Rubber Duck for the show, in recognition of a trend among Jeep owners. The duck stood in the plaza outside Huntington Place.

The 2023 North American Car, Truck, and Utility of the Year semi-finalists were announced and put on display at the show, with the winners to be announced in January 2023.

Production car introductions

2023 Chevrolet Tahoe RST Performance Edition 
2023 Chrysler 300C
2024 Ford Mustang
2023 Jeep Grand Cherokee 4xe 30th Anniversary Edition 
2023 Jeep Wrangler Willys 4xe 
2023 Lincoln Corsair (refresh) 
2023 Toyota Crown (auto show debut)

Concept car introductions
Lincoln Star (auto show debut)

2021
The 2021 edition was also canceled due to the worldwide COVID-19 pandemic, and was instead held as the Detroit Motor Bella outdoor enthusiast event from September 21–26.

Production car introductions

2022 Toyota Tundra

2020
For 2020, the show was to be moved to June, scheduled for June 13–20. It was canceled due to the worldwide COVID-19 pandemic.

2019
The 2019 show ran from January 19–27 at Cobo Center and opened with the lowering of a 2020 Shelby GT500 from the Cobo Center ceiling. 30 cars launched in the previews, down from 69 in 2018. Among various cars, it displayed new versions of the Kia Soul. Other major attractions included the 2020 Shelby GT500. USA Today noted that Chevrolet, Ford, Honda, Jeep and Toyota were all re-introducing discontinued models at the show with the media previews, for example the Toyota Supra and midsize Ford Ranger. Virtual reality displays were utilized by several carmakers. A number of protests took place outside the event regarding Ford's environmental record and GM layoffs.

 January 12 – Gallery
 January 14–15 – Press preview
 January 14–17 – Automobili-D (mobility and autonomy exposition)
 January 16–17 – Industry preview
 January 18 – Charity preview
 January 19–27 – Open to public

Production car introductions

2020 Cadillac XT6
2020 Ford Explorer
2020 Ford Mustang Shelby GT500
2019 Hyundai Elantra GT N-Line
2020 Kia Telluride
2020 Lexus RC F Track Edition
2019 Ram 2500/3500 HD
2020 Subaru WRX STI S209
2020 Toyota Supra
2020 Volkswagen Passat (refresh)

Concept car introductions

 GAC Group (Trumpchi) Entranze
 Infiniti QX Inspiration (electric SUV concept)
 Lexus LC Convertible concept
 Nissan IMs (EV sports sedan)
 Workhorse Group SureFly eVTOL Octocopter concept

Race car introductions
 Hyundai Veloster N TCR
 Subaru WRX STI VT19x (with new livery)

At the show, Ford Motor Company and Volkswagen Group announced a global alliance to collaborate on commercial vans and mid-size pickup trucks, and potentially share EV and autonomous vehicle technology in the future.

2018
The 2018 show took place January 20 to 28 at the Cobo Center. It ran from January 14 to 28. The press preview was extended by one day and the second edition of Automobili-D was extended by three days.

The Washington Post reported that the fastest cars at the 2018 auto show included the 2019 Acura NSX, the 2019 Dodge Challenger SRT Hellcat Widebody, the 2019 Nissan GT-R, the 2019 Alfa Romeo Giulia, and the 2019 Corvette ZR1.
 January 14–16 – Press preview
 January 14–21 – Automobili-D (mobility and autonomy exposition)
 January 17–18 – Industry preview
 January 19 – Charity preview
 January 20–28 – Open to the public

Production car introductions

 2019 Acura RDX (prototype)
 2019 Audi A7 (US debut)
 2019 BMW i8 Coupe (refresh)
 2018 BMW X2
 2019 Chevrolet Silverado
 2019 Ford Edge (refresh), Edge ST
 2019 Ford Mustang Bullitt
 2019 Ford Ranger
 2019 Honda Insight (prototype)
 2019 Hyundai Veloster (second generation)
 2019 Jeep Cherokee (refresh)
 2019 Kia Forte sedan
 2019 Lamborghini Urus (US debut)
 2019 Mercedes-AMG CLS53, E53 Coupe/Cabriolet
 2019 Mercedes-Benz G-Class
 2018 Mercedes-Benz GLS-Class (X166) Grand Edition
 2019 Mini Hatch (refresh)
 2019 Ram 1500
 2018 Rolls-Royce Phantom (US debut)
 2018 Smart Fortwo ED 10th Anniversary Edition (US debut)
 2019 Toyota Avalon
 2019 Volkswagen Jetta
 2018 Volkswagen Passat GT

Concept car introductions

 GAC Group (Trumpchi) Enverge
 Infiniti Q Inspiration
 Lexus LF-1 Limitless
 Nissan Xmotion

2017
The 2017 show ran from January 9 to 22. Automobili-D, an exposition dedicated to automotive autonomy and mobility, ran in conjunction with the show on January 8–12. Sam Slaughter served as chairman.
 January 9–10 – Press preview
 January 11–12 – Industry preview
 January 13 – Charity preview
 January 14–22 – Open to the public

Production car introductions

 2018 Audi A5/S5 Cabriolet
 2018 Audi SQ5
 2017 BMW 5 Series
 2018 Chevrolet Traverse
 2018 Ford F-150 (refresh)
 2018 Ford Mustang (refresh – shown during public days)
 2018 GMC Terrain
 2018 Honda Odyssey
 2018 Kia Stinger
 2018 Lexus LS (XF50)
 2018 Mercedes-AMG GT (refresh), GT C Coupe
 2018 Mercedes-Benz E-Class Coupe
 2018 Mercedes-Benz GLA-Class (refresh)
 2017 Mercedes-Benz S-Class Coupe Night Edition
 2017 Nissan Rogue Sport
 2017 Ram 1500 Rebel Black
 2018 Subaru WRX (refresh)
 2018 Toyota Camry
 2018 Volkswagen Atlas R-Line
 2018 Volkswagen Tiguan (long-wheelbase version)
 2018 Volvo V90 (North American debut)

Concept car introductions

 Audi Q8 concept
 BMW Concept X2 (North American debut)
 Ford Transit Connect Hybrid Taxi Prototype
 Infiniti QX50 Concept
 Nissan Vmotion 2.0
 Volkswagen I.D. Buzz

Race car introductions
 BMW M6 GT3 (North American debut)
 2018 Toyota Camry Cup Car

2016
The 2016 show ran from January 11 to 24. The show drew 5,068 credentialed members of the media from 60 countries during the media preview, with the industry preview afterwards drawing 39,788 visitors from 25 countries and 2,000 companies. Among celebrity visitors was Barack Obama. The first day saw the debut of models like the Lexus LC 500, the new Pacifica minivan, and an Audi hydrogen concept car.

 January 11–12 – Press preview
 January 13–14 – Industry preview
 January 15 – Charity preview
 January 16–24 – Open to the public

Production car introductions

 2017 Audi A4 (North American debut)
 2017 Audi A4 allroad quattro
 2016 BMW M2
 2016 BMW X4 M40i
 2016 Buick Envision (North American debut)
 2017 Chevrolet Cruze Hatchback
 2017 Chrysler Pacifica
 Fisker Force 1
 2017 Ford F-150 Raptor SuperCrew
 2017 Ford Fusion (refresh)
 2017 Genesis G90
 2017 Genesis G80 (refresh)
 2017 GMC Acadia
 2017 Honda Ridgeline
 2016 Infiniti Q50 (refresh)
 2017 Infiniti Q60
 2016 Infiniti QX60 (refresh)
 2017 Kia Forte/Forte5 (refresh)
 2018 Lexus LC 500
 2017 Lincoln Continental
 2017 Mercedes-AMG S65 Cabriolet
 2017 Mercedes-Benz E-Class (sedan)
 2017 Mercedes-Benz SLC-Class (refresh)
 2017 Porsche 911 Turbo, Turbo S (991.2)
 2017 Smart Fortwo Cabrio (North American debut)
 2017 Volvo S90

Concept car introductions

 Acura Precision Concept
 Audi h-tron quattro concept
 Buick Avista
 Kia Telluride
 Nissan IDS (US debut)
 Nissan Titan Warrior Concept
 Volkswagen Tiguan GTE Active Concept

2015
The 2015 show ran from January 12 to 25.
 January 12–13 – Press preview
 January 14–15 – Industry preview
 January 16 – Charity preview
 January 17–25 – Open to the public

Production car introductions

 2017 Acura NSX
 2015 Alfa Romeo 4C Spider
 2017 Audi Q7
 2016 BMW 6 Series, M6 (refresh)
 2016 Buick Cascada
 2016 Cadillac CTS-V
 2016 Chevrolet Volt (second generation)
 2017 Ford F-150 Raptor
 2017 Ford GT
 2016 Ford Shelby GT350R Mustang
 2016 Hyundai Sonata Hybrid (North American debut)
 2016 Hyundai Sonata Plug-in Hybrid
 2017 Jaguar XE (North American debut)
 2016 Lexus GS F
 2016 Lincoln MKX
 2016 Mercedes-Benz C350 Plug-in Hybrid
 2015 Mercedes-Benz C450 AMG
 2016 Mercedes-Benz GLE-Class Coupé
 2015 Mini John Cooper Works Hardtop
 2016 Nissan Titan XD
 2015 Porsche 911 Targa 4 GTS
 2015 Porsche Cayenne Turbo S (refresh)
 2015 Ram 1500 Rebel
 2016 Range Rover Td6, Range Rover Sport Td6 (North American debut)
 2016 Toyota Tacoma
 2016 Volvo S60 Cross Country
 2016 Volvo S60 Inscription (LWB)

Concept car introductions

 Buick Avenir
 Chevrolet Bolt EV
 Honda FCV Concept (North American debut)
 Hyundai Santa Cruz Crossover Truck Concept
 Infiniti Q60 Concept
 Volkswagen Cross Coupe GTE Concept

2014
The 2014 show ran from January 13 to 26.
 January 13–14 – Press preview
 January 15–16 – Industry preview
 January 17 – Charity preview
 January 18–26 – Open to the public

Production car introductions

 2015 Audi A8/S8 (facelift) (North American debut)
 2015 Audi Q3 (North American debut)
 2014 BMW 2 Series
 2015 BMW M3
 2015 BMW M4
 2015 Cadillac ATS Coupe
 2015 Chevrolet Corvette Z06
 2015 Chrysler 200
 2015 Ford F-150
 2015 Ford Mustang (auto show debut)
 2015 GMC Canyon
 2015 Honda Fit
 2015 Hyundai Genesis
 2015 Lexus RC (North American debut)
 2015 Lexus RC F
 2015 Mercedes-Benz C-Class
 2015 Mercedes-Benz GLA45 AMG
 2015 Mercedes-Benz S600
 2015 Porsche 911 Targa
 2015 Subaru WRX STI
 2015 Volkswagen Golf R (North American debut)

Concept car introductions

 Acura TLX Prototype
 Audi allroad shooting brake
 Infiniti Q50 Eau Rouge
 Kia GT4 Stinger
 Mercedes-Benz Concept S-Class Coupé (North American debut)
 Mini John Cooper Works concept
 Nissan IDx Freeflow and IDx NISMO (U.S. debut)
 Nissan Sport Sedan concept
 Toyota FT-1
 Volkswagen Beetle Dune
 Volkswagen Passat BlueMotion Concept
 Volvo Concept XC Coupe

Race car introductions

 Acura TLX GT Race Car
 Chevrolet Corvette C7.R

2013
The 2013 show ran from January 14 to 27.
 January 14–15 – Press preview
 January 16–17 – Industry preview
 January 18 – Charity preview
 January 19–27 – Open to the public

Production car introductions

 2014 Audi R8 (facelift)
 2013 Audi RS5 Cabriolet (North American debut)
 2014 Audi RS7
 2014 Audi SQ5 (gasoline version)
 Bentley Continental GT Speed Convertible
 2013 BMW 320i (U.S. market debut)
 2014 BMW M6 Gran Coupe
 2014 BMW Z4 (E89)
 2014 Cadillac ELR
 2014 Chevrolet Corvette Stingray
 2014 Chevrolet Silverado
 2013 Chrysler 300 Motown Edition
 2013 Dodge Dart GT
 2015 Ford Transit (North American debut)
 2014 GMC Sierra
 2014 Infiniti Q50
 2014 Jeep Compass
 2014 Jeep Grand Cherokee (facelift)
 2014 Kia Cadenza (North American debut)
 2014 Lexus IS
 2014 Maserati Quattroporte
 2014 Mercedes-Benz CLA-Class
 2014 Mercedes-Benz E-Class (facelift)
 2014 Mini John Cooper Works Paceman
 2014 Nissan Versa Note (North American debut)
 2014 Porsche Cayenne Turbo S
 2013 Shelby Focus ST
 2014 Volkswagen Tiguan R-Line
 2014 Volkswagen Touareg R-Line

Concept car introductions

 Acura MDX pre-production concept
 Acura NSX Concept (updated 2013 version with interior)
 BMW Concept 4 Series Coupe
 Fiat 500 Abarth "Tenebra" and "Cattiva" design concepts
 Ford Atlas
 Honda Urban SUV Concept
 Hyundai HCD-14 Genesis
 Lincoln MKC concept
 Nissan Resonance
 Toyota Corolla Furia
 Volkswagen Crossblue
 Volkswagen Passat Performance Concept

Chevrolet also displayed five models sold outside the United States: the Onix, Orlando, Sail, Spin, and Trax.

2012

The 2012 show ran from January 9 to 22.
 January 9–10 – Press preview
 January 11–12 – Industry preview
 January 13 – Charity preview
 January 14–22 – Open to the public

Nissan returned to the show after a three-year absence.

Bryan Herta was presented with the Baby Borg trophy for the 2011 Indianapolis 500 during the show, which coincided with the promotion of the return of the IZOD IndyCar Series to Detroit later in June. A replica Baby Borg was also presented to Suzie Wheldon, the widow of the winning driver of the race.

Production car introductions

 2013 Acura RDX
 2013 Audi A4
 2013 Audi S4
 2013 Audi allroad
 2012 Bentley Continental GT V8
 2012 BMW 3 Series (North American debut)
 2012 BMW ActiveHybrid 3
 2012 BMW ActiveHybrid 5
 2013 Buick Encore
 2013 Cadillac ATS
 2013 Chevrolet Sonic RS
 2012 Chrysler 200 Super S
 2012 Dodge Charger Redline
 2013 Dodge Dart
 2013 Ford Fusion
 2013 Hyundai Genesis Coupe (North American debut)
 2013 Hyundai Veloster Turbo
 2013 Lexus LX
 2013 Mercedes-Benz SL-Class
 2012 Mini Roadster
 2012 Porsche 911 Carrera/Carrera S Cabriolet
 2013 Scion FR-S (North American debut)
 2013 Subaru BRZ (U.S. debut)
 2012 Toyota Prius c (North American debut)
 2013 Volkswagen Jetta Hybrid

Concept car introductions

 Acura ILX concept
 Acura NSX concept
 Audi Q3 Vail
 Chevrolet Code 130R
 Chevrolet Tru 140S
 Chrysler 700C
 Ford Evos (North American debut)
 Honda Accord Coupe concept
 Lexus LF-LC
 Lincoln MKZ concept
 Maserati Kubang (North American debut)
 Nissan e-NV200 Concept
 Nissan Pathfinder concept
 smart Forus
 Toyota NS4
 Volkswagen E-Bugster
 Volvo XC60 Plug-in Hybrid

2011
The 2011 show ran from January 10 to 23.
 January 10–11 – Press preview
 January 12–13 – Industry preview
 January 14 – Charity preview
 January 15–23 – Open to the public

Porsche returned to the show for the first time since 2007. A new "Smarter Living in Michigan" section showcased alternative energy technologies outside of the automotive sector, in addition to an electric vehicle track condensed from its 2010 size.

Production car introductions

 2012 Audi A6
 2012 BMW 1 Series M Coupe
 2012 BMW 6 Series (F12) Convertible
 2012 Buick Verano
 2012 Chevrolet Sonic
 2011 Chrysler 300
 2012 Ford C-Max (North American debut – production plans canceled)
 2013 Ford C-Max Energi
 2013 Ford C-Max Hybrid
 2012 Hyundai Veloster
 2011 Jeep Compass
 2012 Mercedes-Benz C-Class
 2012 Mercedes-Benz S350 Bluetec
 2013 Toyota Prius Plug-in
 2012 Toyota Prius V
 2012 Volkswagen Passat (North American version)

Concept car introductions

 Ford Vertrek
 GMC Sierra All Terrain HD
 Honda Civic & Civic Si concept
 Hyundai Curb
 Kia KV7
 Mini Paceman
 Porsche 918 RSR
 Toyota Prius C Concept

2010
The 2010 show ran from January 11 to 24.
 January 11–12 – Press preview
 January 13–14 – Industry preview
 January 15 – Charity preview
 January 16–24 – Open to the public

A new "Electric Avenue" section showcased electric vehicles from around the world, including some entrants for the Automotive X-Prize. Saab, Hummer, Infiniti, Suzuki, and Porsche did not attend the 2010 show. Nissan and Mitsubishi did not have regular floor space, but the Nissan Leaf and Mitsubishi i MiEV appeared in the Electric Avenue section. A small electrical fire at the Audi exhibit caused an evacuation on January 21. Nobody was hurt.

Production car introductions

 2011 BMW 740i/Li (North American debut)
 2011 BMW Z4 (E89) sDrive35is
 2011 Cadillac CTS-V Coupe
 2011 Ford Focus
 2011 Ford Mustang GT
 2011 Ford Mustang Boss 302R
 2011 GMC Acadia Denali
 2011 Honda CR-Z
 2010 Hyundai Santa Fe
 2010 Jeep Liberty Renegade
 2010 Jeep Wrangler Islander / Mountain editions
 2011 Lincoln MKX
 2011 Mercedes-Benz E-Class Cabriolet
 Revenge Verde supercar

Concept car introductions

 Audi e-Tron (brand) Detroit showcar
 BMW Concept ActiveE
 Buick Regal GS
 Cadillac XTS Platinum
 Chevrolet Aveo RS
 Chrysler/Lancia Delta
 Fiat 500 electric
 GMC Granite
 Hyundai Blue-Will plug-in hybrid
 Mini Beachcomber
 Toyota FT-CH dedicated hybrid
 Volkswagen NCC
 Volvo C30 electric

2009
The 2009 show ran from January 11 to 25.
 January 11–13 – Press days
 January 14–15 – Industry days
 January 16 – Charity preview
 January 17–25 – Open to the public

Nissan, Infiniti, Mitsubishi, Suzuki, Rolls-Royce, Land Rover, Ferrari, and Porsche did not attend the 2009 auto show, the largest number of non-returning automakers in the show's history. As a result, the show became the first with Chinese automakers (BYD and Brilliance) exhibited on the main floor.

Production car introductions

 2010 Audi A3 2.0 TDI (North American debut)
 2009 BMW Z4 (E89)
 2010 Buick LaCrosse
 2010 Cadillac SRX
 2011 Chevrolet Cruze (North American debut)
 2010 Chevrolet Equinox
 Fisker Karma
 2010 Ford Mustang Shelby GT500
 2010 Ford Taurus
 2010 Honda Insight
 2010 Jaguar XFR
 2010 Jaguar XKR
 2010 Lexus HS 250h
 2010 Lincoln MKT
 2009 Mini Cooper Convertible
 2009 Saab 9-5 Griffin
 2010 Toyota Camry
 2010 Toyota Prius

The 2010 Mercedes-Benz E-Class was announced and shown to invited members of the press, but was not put on public display until the March 2010 Geneva Motor Show.

GM also announced the production of the Chevrolet Spark mini-car (previously shown as the Chevrolet Beat concept), for sale in Europe in 2010 and North America in 2011, as well as the Chevrolet Orlando compact MPV, for sale in North America in 2011. The Spark will be shown at the 2009 Geneva Motor Show.

Concept car introductions

 Audi Sportback concept
 Cadillac Converj
 Chevrolet Orlando concept (North American debut)
 Chrysler 200C EV
 Dodge Circuit EV
 Fisker Karma S Concept
 Jeep Patriot EV
 Kia Soul'ster
 Lincoln C
 Mercedes-Benz BlueZero concepts
 E-Cell (electric)
 E-Plus (plug-in hybrid), 100 km electric-only range
 F-Cell (fuel cell)
 Subaru Legacy concept
 Toyota FT-EV
 Volkswagen Concept BlueSport
 Volvo S60 concept

2008
The 2008 show ran from January 13 to 27.
 January 13–15 – Press days
 January 16–17 – Industry days
 January 18 – Charity preview
 January 19–27 – Open to the public

Production car introductions

 2009 Audi TTS
 2008 BMW 1 Series Convertible (North American debut)
 2009 BMW 335d (North American debut)
 2009 BMW X5 (E70) xDrive35d
 2009 BMW X6
 2009 Cadillac CTS-V
 2009 Chevrolet Corvette ZR-1
 2009 Dodge Ram
 2009 Ford F-150
 2009 Hyundai Genesis
 2012 Land Rover Range Rover Evoque
 2009 Kia Borrego
 2009 Mazda RX-8
 2009 Mercedes-Benz SLK-Class (North American debut)
 2009 Mitsubishi Lancer Ralliart
 2008 Scion xB RS 5.0 ("Mica Gold")
 2009 Saturn Vue Green Line 2-Mode Hybrid
 2009 Subaru Forester
 2009 Toyota Venza
 2009 Volkswagen Passat CC

Concept car introductions

 Audi R8 TDI
 Buick Riviera (North American debut)
 BYD F6DM
 Cadillac CTS Coupe concept
 Cadillac Provoq (also appearing at the 2008 Consumer Electronics Show)
 Chrysler ecoVoyager
 Dodge ZEO
 Fisker Karma
 Ford Explorer America
 Ford Verve
 Hummer HX
 Honda Pilot Prototype
 Jeep Renegade
 Land Rover LRX
 Lincoln MKT concept
 Lexus LF-A Roadster
 Mazda Furai
 Mercedes-Benz Vision GLK Freeside
 Mitsubishi Concept-RA
 Nissan Forum
 Saab 9-4X BioPower
 Saturn Flextreme
 Toyota A-BAT

2007
The 2007 show was held from January 7 to 21.
 January 7–9 – Press days
 January 10–11 – Industry days
 January 12 – Charity preview
 January 13–21 – Open to the public

Production car introductions

 2008 Audi Q7 3.0 TDi
 2007 BMW 3 Series convertible
 2008 Cadillac CTS
 2008 Chevrolet Equinox Sport
 Chevrolet HHR Premium Edition
 2008 Chevrolet Malibu
 2008 Chrysler Town and Country
 2008 Dodge Avenger
 2008 Dodge Grand Caravan
 2008 Dodge Magnum
 2008 Dodge Viper SRT-10
 2008 Ford Five Hundred (renamed to Ford Taurus for the 2007 Chicago Auto Show)
 2008 Ford Focus
 2007 Hyundai Veracruz (North American introduction)
 2008 Infiniti QX56
 2008 Lexus IS-F
 2007 Maserati Quattroporte Automatica
 2008 Mazda Tribute HEV
 2007 MINI Cooper (North American introduction)
 2007 MINI Sidewalk
 2008 Mitsubishi Lancer
 2008 Nissan Rogue
 2008 Pontiac G6 GXP
 2008 Pontiac Torrent GXP
 2008 Porsche Cayenne
 2008 Rolls-Royce Phantom Drophead Coupé
 2007 Scion tC RS 3.0 ("Blizzard Pearl")
 2008 Smart Fortwo (North American introduction)
 2008 Subaru Legacy (North American introduction)
 2008 Subaru Outback (North American introduction)
 2007 Toyota Tundra CrewMax

Concept car introductions

 Acura Advanced Sports Car concept
 Audi Q7 V12 TDI concept (North American introduction)
 Changfeng Liebao CS7 concept
 Changfeng Liebao CS6 concept
 Changfeng Feibao CT5 concept
 Changfeng UU-CT3 concept
 Changfeng rhombus concept car
 Chevrolet Camaro Convertible concept
 Chevrolet Volt
 Chrysler Nassau
 Dodge Viper SRT-10 Mopar concept
 Ford Airstream
 Ford Interceptor
 Honda Accord Coupe concept
 Hummer H3 Open-Top concept
 Jaguar C-XF (Concept XF)
 Jeep Trailhawk
 Kia Kue
 Lexus LF-A (updated concept)
 Lincoln MKR concept
 Mazda Ryuga
 Mercedes-Benz Vision GL420 Bluetec
 Mercedes-Benz Ocean Drive
 Mitsubishi Prototype-X (Lancer Evolution Prototype)
 Nissan Bevel
 Saab 9-3 BioPower Hybrid concept
 Suzuki Flix
 Toyota FT-HS Hybrid Sports concept
 Volvo XC60 concept
 Volvo BeeVan

GM also displayed five "global" concept cars for the first time in North America: Chevrolet T2X, Chevrolet WTCC, Holden Efijy, Opel Antara GTC, and Saab Aero-X.

2006
The 2006 show was held from January 8 to 22.
 January 8–10 – Press days
 January 11–12 – Industry days
 January 13 – Charity preview
 January 14–22 – Open to the public

Production car introductions

 2006 Audi RS4
 2007 Audi S6
 2007 Audi S8
 2006 BMW 325xi Sports Wagon
 2007 BMW M Roadster
 2006 BMW M6
 2006 BMW Z4 (E85) Coupe
 2007 Cadillac Escalade
 2007 Cadillac Escalade ESV
 2007 Cadillac Escalade EXT
 2007 Chevrolet Aveo
 2007 Chevrolet Suburban LTZ
 2007 Chevrolet Tahoe LTZ
 2007 Chevrolet Tahoe Two-Mode Hybrid
 2007 Chrysler Aspen
 2007 Dodge Caliber
 2007 Ford Edge
 2007 Ford Shelby GT500
 2007 Ford Explorer Sport Trac Adrenalin
 2007 GMC Yukon
 2007 GMC Yukon XL
 2007 Honda Fit
 2007 Hummer H3x
 2007 Hyundai Santa Fe
 2007 Jaguar XK convertible
 2007 Jeep Compass
 2007 Jeep Wrangler
 2007 Kia Optima
 2007 Lexus LS
 2007 Lincoln MKX
 2006 Maserati GranSport Spyder
 2006 Maserati Quattroporte Sport GT and Executive GT
 2007 Mercedes-Benz E320 Bluetec
 2007 Mercedes-Benz GL320 Bluetec
 2007 Mercedes-Benz GL450
 2007 Mercedes-Benz ML63 AMG
 2007 Mercedes-Benz R63 AMG
 2007 Mercedes-Benz S550
 2007 Mercedes-Benz S65 AMG
 2007 Mitsubishi Eclipse Spyder
 2007 Nissan Versa
 2007 Nissan Sentra
 2007 Pontiac Solstice GXP
 2007 Saturn Sky
 2007 Saturn Vue Green Line
 2007 Toyota Camry (AutoWeek "Most Significant")
 2007 Toyota Camry Hybrid
 2007 Toyota FJ Cruiser
 2007 Toyota Yaris
 2006 Volvo C70 Convertible
 Geely 7151CK (the first Chinese automobile ever shown in the United States, only shown to press)

Concept car introductions

 Aston Martin Rapide concept
 Acura RDX prototype
 Audi Roadjet
 BMW X3 Hybrid Efficient Dynamics concept
 Buick Enclave concept
 Chevrolet Camaro concept (AutoWeek "Best In Show")
 Chrysler Imperial concept
 Dodge Challenger concept (AutoWeek "Best Concept")
 Ford F-250 Super Chief
 Ford Iosis (North American introduction)
 Ford Reflex
 Hyundai HCD9 Talus
 Infiniti G35 Coupe concept
 Jeep Patriot concept
 Kia Soul
 Lamborghini Miura concept
 Lincoln MKS concept
 Maybach Exelero
 Mazda Kabura concept
 Mazda Mazda5 hydrogen rotary concept
 Mini Concept Detroit
 Mitsubishi Concept-CT MIEV
 Nissan Urge (AutoWeek "Most Fun"), with built in Xbox 360
 Saab 9-5 Aero BioPower concept
 Subaru B5-TPH
 Toyota F3R
 Volvo C30 concept

2005

Production car introductions

 2006 Acura RL
 2006 Cadillac STS-V
 2006 Chevrolet Corvette Z06
 2006 Chrysler 300C SRT-8
 2006 Dodge Charger
 2006 Dodge Viper SRT-10 Coupe
 2006 Ford Fusion
 2006 Honda Ridgeline
 2006 Hyundai Sonata
 2006 Infiniti M
 2006 Kia Rio
 2006 Land Rover Range Rover
 2006 Land Rover Range Rover Sport
 2006 Lincoln Zephyr/MKZ
 2006 Mercedes-Benz M-Class
 2006 Mercury Milan
 2006 Mitsubishi Eclipse
 2006 Mitsubishi Raider
 2006 Porsche 911 Cabrio
 2005 Saab 9-7X
 2006 Subaru B9 Tribeca
 2005 Toyota Avalon

Concept car introductions

 Chrysler Firepower
 Ford Explorer Sport Trac Concept
 Ford Fairlane Concept
 Ford Shelby GR-1
 Ford SYNUS
 General Motors Sequel
 GMC Graphyte
 Infiniti Kuraza
 Jaguar Advanced Lightweight Coupe Concept
 Jeep Gladiator (2005 concept)
 Jeep Hurricane
 Kia KCD-II Mesa
 Lexus LF-A concept
 Mazda MX-Crossport
 Mercury Meta One
 Nissan AZEAL
 Opel Astra hybrid concept
 Saturn Aura concept
 Saturn Sky concept
 Suzuki Concept X
 Toyota FT-SX
 Volkswagen New Beetle Ragster
 Volvo 3CC

2004

The 2004 show was held from January 10 to 19.

Production car introductions

 2005 Chevrolet Corvette (C6)
 2005 Ford Five Hundred
 2005 Ford Freestyle
 2005 Ford Mustang
 2005 Infiniti QX56
 2005 Kia Spectra
 2005 Lexus GS
 2005 Nissan Frontier
 2005 Nissan Pathfinder
 2005 Pontiac G6
 2005 Pontiac Solstice
 2005 Scion tC
 2005 Volvo S40
 2005 Volvo V50

Concept car introductions

 Chevrolet Nomad (2004 concept)
 Chrysler ME Four-Twelve
 Dodge Slingshot
 Ford Bronco (2004 concept)
 Honda SUT
 Jeep Rescue
 Land Rover Range Stormer
 Lincoln Aviator (2004 concept)
 Lincoln Mark X
 Mazda MX-Micro Sport
 Mercedes-Benz Vision GST (2004 concept)
 Mitsubishi Eclipse Concept-E
 Mitsubishi Sport Truck Concept
 Nissan Actic
 Saturn Curve
 Toyota FTX
 Toyota Rugged Youth Utility
 Volkswagen Concept T

2003

The 2003 show was held from January 11 to 20.

Production car introductions

 2004 Acura TSX
 2004 Cadillac SRX
 2004 Chevrolet Colorado
 2005 Chevrolet Equinox
 2004 Chevrolet Malibu
 2004 Ford F-150
 2003 Infiniti FX45
 2004 Lexus RX 330
 2004 Mitsubishi Endeavor
 2004 Nissan Maxima
 2004 Nissan Quest
 2004 Nissan Titan
 2004 Pontiac Grand Prix
 2003 Rolls-Royce Phantom VII
 2004 Toyota Sienna

Concept car introductions

 Aston Martin AMV8 Vantage
 Audi Pikes Peak
 BMW xActivity
 Buick Centieme
 Cadillac Sixteen
 Chevrolet Cheyenne
 Chevrolet SS (2003 concept)
 Dodge Avenger (2003 concept)
 Dodge Durango (concept)
 Dodge Kahuna
 Dodge Tomahawk V10 'motorcycle'
 Ford 427
 Ford Freestyle FX
 Ford Model U
 Ford Mustang GT (2003 concept)
 Infiniti Triant
 Kia KCD-1 Slice
 Lincoln Navicross
 Matra P75
 Mazda Washu
 Mercury Messenger
 Mitsubishi Tarmac Spyder
 Pontiac G6 (concept)
 Toyota Fine-S

2002

Production car introductions

 2003 Audi A4 Cabriolet
 2002 Bentley Arnage T
 2004 Cadillac XLR 
 2003 Ford Expedition
 2003 Honda Pilot
 2003 Infiniti G35
 2003 Lexus GX 470
 2002 Maserati Coupé
 2003 Mazda6
 2003 Mazda RX-8 (North American debut)
 2003 Range Rover
 2003 Subaru Baja
 2002 Suzuki Aerio
 2003 Volvo XC90

Concept car introductions

 Acura RD-X concept
 Cadillac Cien
 Chevrolet Bel Air concept
 Chrysler Pacifica concept
 Dodge M80
 Dodge Ram SRT-10 concept
 Dodge Razor
 Ford GT40
 Ford Mighty F-350 Tonka
 Infiniti FX45 concept
 Isuzu Axiom SXR, SXT
 Jeep Compass concept
 Lincoln Continental concept
 Mercedes-Benz Vision GST
 Mitsubishi SUP (Sports Utility Pack)
 Nissan Quest concept
 Pontiac Solstice concept
 Saab 9-3X concept
 Toyota ccX
 Volkswagen Magellan

2001

Production car introductions
 BMW M3 Convertible
 Daewoo Leganza
 Dodge Viper
 Ford Thunderbird
 Infiniti Q45 
 Jeep Liberty
 Lexus SC430
 Mercedes-Benz C-Class Wagon
 Nissan Sentra SE-R
 Subaru Impreza WRX
 Toyota Matrix

Concept car introductions
 BMW X-Coupe
 Chrysler Crossfire
Cunningham C7
Dodge Super 8 Hemi
 Honda Model X
Infiniti FX45
 Jeep Willys
Mitsubishi RPM 7000
 Nissan alpha-T
 Oldsmobile Alero, Aurora, Intrigue Zebra Show Vehicle
Volkswagen Microbus
 Volvo ACC
 Volvo SCC

2000

Concept car introductions
 Dodge Viper GTS-R Concept
 Ford Equator
 GMC Terradyne
 Honda Spocket
 Mercedes-Benz Vision SLA

1999

Concept car introductions
 Cadillac Evoq 
 Chevrolet Nomad concept
 Dodge Charger concept
 Ford Thunderbird
 Jeep Commander concept
 Lincoln Blackwood
 Mercedes-Benz Vision SLR concept
Mercury My concept
 Nissan 240Z concept
 Oldsmobile Recon 
 Pontiac Aztek concept
 Pontiac GTO concept

1998

Production car introductions

 Aston Martin DB7 "Alfred Dunhill"
 Chrysler 300M
 Chrysler LHS
 Dodge Dakota R/T Club Cab
 Dodge Dakota R/T Regular Cab
 Ford Ranger
 Ford NASCAR Taurus
 GMC Jimmy 5-door
 GMC Yukon Denali
 Isuzu Amigo
 Isuzu Rodeo
 Isuzu Trooper
 Lexus RX300
 Mercedes-Benz ML430
 Mercedes-Benz CLK430
 Jeep Grand Cherokee
 Oldsmobile Alero
 Pontiac Grand Am
 Saab 9-3
 Subaru Legacy SUS
 Toyota Camry Solara Coupe
 Volkswagen New Beetle

Concept car introductions

 Aston Martin Project Vantage
 Dodge TekQua 
 Dodge Big Red Truck 
 Dodge Intrepid ESX2 
 Buick Signia 
 Chevrolet Monte Carlo Intimidator 
 Chevrolet Guts Truck
 Chevrolet Silverado Show Truck
 Chrysler Chronos
 Jeep Jeepster
 Mitsubishi SST
 Oldsmobile Bravada X-Scape 
 Plymouth Pronto Spyder
 Pontiac Montana Thunder 
 Ford P2000 DIATA 
 Ford Alpe Limited 
 Ford Courier F1 
 General Motors EV1 parallel hybrid
 General Motors EV1 CNG
 General Motors EV1 fuel cell
 General Motors EV1 Electric
 Mobility Outfitters Gear Box Concept
 GMC Sierra ACE Show Truck
 Acura TL-X Concept
 Audi Allroad Quattro Concept
 Honda MV-99
 BMW R1200C Sidecar Concept
 Suzuki SUP-1
 Karmann AFB Concept

1997

Production car introductions

 1997 Chevrolet Corvette C5
 1998 Chrysler Concorde
 1998 Dodge Durango
 1998 Dodge Intrepid
 1998 Ford Escort ZX2
 1998 Mercedes-Benz CLK
 1998 Subaru Forester
 1998 Toyota Sienna
 1998 Volvo C70 convertible

Concept car introductions

 CCS Solstice
 Chrysler Phaeton
 Dodge Copperhead
 Ford Tremor
 Hyundai Tiburon Convertible Concept
 Jeep Dakar
 Jeep Icon
 Karmann Open View
 Lexus HPS
 Mercury MC4
 Oldsmobile Alero Alpha Concept
 Plymouth Pronto
 Pontiac Rageous
 Volkswagen Coupe Study CJ

1996

Concept car introductions
Ford Indigo
Ford Synergy 2010
 Lincoln Sentinel

1995

This edition featured 52 new vehicles, including 39 worldwide introductions.

Production car introductions

 AM General Hummer H1
 Acura NSX-T
 BMW 740iL
 Dodge Viper RT/10
 Dodge Caravan
 Cadillac Eldorado
 Chrysler Town & Country
 Chrysler Voyager
 Chrysler Grand Voyager
 Eagle Vision TSi "Autostick"
 GMC Yukon
 Gillet Vertigo
 Jeep Grand Cherokee Orvis
 Land Rover Defender 90
 Lincoln Mark VIII LSC
 Ford Taurus
 Ford Explorer
 Mercury Sable
 Mercury Mystique "Young America" Edition
 Hyundai Accent
 Lamborghini Diablo VT Roadster
 Oldsmobile Bravada
 Plymouth Voyager
 Suzuki Esteem GL
 Suzuki Esteem GLX
 Suzuki Sidekick Sport
 Toyota T100 XtraCab

Concept car introductions

 Acura CL-X
 Buick XP2000
 Chrysler Atlantic Concept
 Dodge Avenger RT Concept
 Eagle Jazz Concept
 Ford GT90
 Ford Triton Concept
 Ford Windstar SHO-Star Concept
 Hyundai HCD-III
 Lincoln L2K Concept
 Oldsmobile Antares Concept
 Plymouth Backpack
 Pontiac Grand Prix 300GPX Concept

1994

Production car introductions

 Acura Integra
 Acura Legend GS
 Audi Cabriolet (facelift)
 BMW 325i Cabrio
 Buick Riviera
 Cadillac DeVille
 Chevrolet Camaro Convertible
 Chevrolet Lumina
 Chevrolet Monte Carlo
 Chrysler Cirrus
 Chrysler New Yorker
 Chrysler LHS
 Dodge Stealth
 Dodge Stratus
 Dodge Viper GTS
 Ford Aspire
 Ford Mustang (facelift)
 Ford Thunderbird (facelift)
 Ford Cougar (facelift)
 Ford Windstar
 GMC Jimmy
 Honda Accord
 Hyundai Elantra (facelift)
 Hyundai Sonata
 Infiniti G20t
 Isuzu Trooper SE
 Isuzu Rodeo (facelift)
 Lincoln Continental
 Mazda Millenia
 Mercedes-Benz C220
 Mercedes-Benz C280
 Oldsmobile Aurora
 Pontiac TransSport (facelift)
 Porsche 911 Carrera
 Saab 900
 Toyota Celica

Concept car introductions

 ASC GMC Sunoma
 ASC Chrysler 300
 ASC Crown Victoria LSS
 Cadillac LSE
 Chrysler Aviat
 Dodge Venom
 Eagle Vision Aerie
 Ford Ranger Sea Splash
 Ford Powerstroke (Power Stroke)
 Lincoln Contempra
 Mercury Premys
 Plymouth Expresso
 Pontiac Sunfire Speedster
 Volkswagen Concept 1

1993

Production car introductions

 BMW 325is
 BMW 5 Series
 Chevrolet Camaro Z28 Coupe
 Chevrolet Camaro Z28 Indy 500 Pace Car
 Chevrolet Impala SS
 Chrysler LHS
 Chrysler New Yorker
 Dodge Ram 1500
 Ford Explorer Limited
 Lincoln Mark VIII
 Mitsubishi Galant
 Subaru Impreza
 Toyota T100
 Volkswagen Jetta GLX

Concept car introductions

 Cadillac Seville Coupe Concept by ASC
 Chevrolet Highlander Concept
 Chevrolet Corvette LT-1 Spyder by ASC
 Chevrolet Bass Sport Concept
 Chrysler Thunderbolt Concept
 Chrysler Patriot Concept
 Dodge Ram Sport V10 Concept
 Ford Ranger Open-Air Flare Concept by ASC
 GMC Santa Fe Concept
 Hyundai HCD-II Epoch Concept
 Jeep ECCO
 Mazda Cubist
 Mercedes-Benz "Panorama Roof" SL Concept
 Mercury Villager Nautica Concept
 Plymouth Prowler Concept
 Porsche Boxster Concept
 Pontiac Grand Prix GTP Concept
 Saturn Coupe + Roadster Concept by ASC

1992

Production car introductions

 Audi 100CS Quattro
 Audi Cabriolet
 BMW E36 3 Series coupes
 Chrysler Concorde
 Chrysler New Yorker
 Dodge Intrepid
 Eagle Vision
 Cadillac Allanté
 Cadillac Allanté Pace Car
 Jeep Grand Cherokee
 Mercedes-Benz S600 Coupe
 Honda Civic CRX
 Mazda MX-6
 Toyota Camry SE
 Porsche 911 Carrera RS America
 Saturn SW
 Lamborghini LM American

Concept car introductions

 Buick Sceptre
 Chevrolet Lumina Sizigi Concept
 Chevrolet Corvette Sting Ray III Concept
 Chrysler Cirrus Concept
 Dodge EPIC
 Ford Connecta (Ghia)
 Ford F-150 SuperFlare Concept
 General Motors Ultralite
 Hyundai HCD-1
 Lincoln Marque X
 Oldsmobile Anthem
 Pontiac Salsa
 Pontiac Salsa Sport

1991

 Chevrolet Corvette ZR-1 Spyder Concept
Mercedes-Benz F100

1990

The 1990 Detroit Auto Show was held on January 6–14.

Concept car introductions

 Acura NSX
 ASC Vision II
 Buick Bolero
 Buick Park Avenue 
 Cadillac Aurora
 Chevrolet Corvette CERV III
 C&C LSV
 C&C Tresaire
 Dodge Daytona R/T
 Dodge LRT
 Eagle Optima
 Ford Surf 
 Geo Tracker Hugger
 GM Micro Concept
 GMC Mahalo
 Jeep Freedom
 Jeep Rubicon Wrangler
 Mercury Cyclone
 Nissan Gobi
 Oldsmobile Expression
 Plymouth Voyager 3
 Pontiac Sunfire

1989
The Detroit Auto Show was renamed the North American International Auto Show for 1989, as Lexus and Infiniti debuted. The show opened on January 11, with press previews and introductions for the first two days.

Production car introductions

 Audi V8
 Chevrolet Lumina
 Chevrolet Lumina APV
 Chevrolet Corvette ZR-1
 Chrysler LeBaron GT
 Chrysler Town & Country
 Dodge Dakota convertible
 Geo Prizm
 Geo Storm
 Infiniti Q45
 Lexus LS400
 Lotus Esprit Turbo
 Mazda MPV
 Mitsubishi Eclipse
 Plymouth Laser
 Porsche 911 Carrera 4 and Speedster
 Porsche 944 S2 Cabriolet
 Shelby Dakota
 Shelby CSX-VNT
 Volkswagen Corrado

Concept car introductions

 Chevrolet PPG XT-2 Concept
 Chrysler Millenium Concept
 Chrysler PPG Le Baron Pace Car Concept
 Dodge Viper VM-01 Concept
 Mercury Concept 50
 Oldsmobile Aerotech II
 Oldsmobile Aerotech III
 Plymouth Speedster Concept
 Pontiac Stinger Concept

1987
The 1987 show ran from January 10 to 18.

Production models introductions

Cadillac Allanté

Concept cars introductions

 Dodge Daytona 199x
 Pontiac Pursuit
 Chevrolet Express Concept
 Oldsmobile Aerotech I Long Tail
 Oldsmobile Aerotech I Short Tail

See also
 North American Car of the Year

References

External links

Official webpage

Auto shows in the United States
Culture of Detroit
Economy of Detroit
Tourist attractions in Detroit
Recurring events established in 1907
1907 establishments in Michigan
2010s in Detroit